The following lists events that happened during 1984 in the People's Republic of China.

Incumbents
General Secretary of the Communist Party: Hu Yaobang
President: Li Xiannian
Premier: Zhao Ziyang
Chairman: Deng Yingchao 
Vice President: Ulanhu
Vice Premier: Wan Li

Governors  
 Governor of Anhui Province – Wang Yuzhao 
 Governor of Fujian Province – Hu Ping 
 Governor of Gansu Province – Chen Guangyi
 Governor of Guangdong Province – Liang Lingguang 
 Governor of Guizhou Province – Wang Zhaowen
 Governor of Hebei Province – Zhang Shuguang 
 Governor of Heilongjiang Province – Chen Lei 
 Governor of Henan Province – He Zhukang 
 Governor of Hubei Province – Huang Zhizhen 
 Governor of Hunan Province – Liu Zheng 
 Governor of Jiangsu Province – Gu Xiulian 
 Governor of Jiangxi Province – Zhao Zengyi  
 Governor of Jilin Province – Zhao Xiu 
 Governor of Liaoning Province – Quan Shuren
 Governor of Qinghai Province – Huang Jingbo  
 Governor of Shaanxi Province – Li Qingwei 
 Governor of Shandong Province – Liang Buting 
 Governor of Shanxi Province – Wang Senhao 
 Governor of Sichuan Province – Yang Xizong
 Governor of Yunnan Province – Pu Chaozhu 
 Governor of Zhejiang Province – Xue Ju

Events
January 1 – Industrial and Commercial Bank of China was established.
November 1 – Lenovo was founded, as predecessor name was China Academy of Science Computational Development Company.
December 19 – Signing of the Sino-British Joint Declaration

Culture
List of Chinese films in 1984

Sport
October 13 to 24 – 1984 ABC Championship for Women, in Shanghai
China at the 1984 Summer Paralympics
China at the 1984 Summer Olympics won a total of 32 medals
China at the 1984 Winter Olympics won no medals

Births
June 20 - An Yiru, freelance writer Zhang Li
November 12 - Yan Zi, tennis player

References

 
China
China